Ulrike Grömping is a German statistician known for her work on regression analysis with variable importance, and for her R package relaimpo for performing linear regression with relative importance. She is Professor for Applied Statistics and Business Mathematics at the Berliner Hochschule für Technik.

Education and career
Grömping studied statistics at the Technical University of Dortmund, earning a diploma there in 1991. She completed her Ph.D. in statistics there in 1996. Her dissertation, Tests for a Monotone Dose-Response Relation in Models with Ordered Categorical Dose with Emphasis on Likelihood Ratio Tests for Linear Inequalities on Normal Means, was supervised by Siegfried Schach.

After working as a statistician for the Ford Motor Company in Cologne from 1997 to 2004, Grömping returned to academia as a professor at the Technische Fachhochschule Berlin (now the Berliner Hochschule für Technik) in 2004.

References

External links
Home page
relaimpo

Year of birth missing (living people)
Living people
German statisticians
Women statisticians
Technical University of Dortmund alumni